This is a list of public art in the Warwickshire county of England. This list applies only to works of public art on permanent display in an outdoor public space. For example, this does not include artworks in museums.

Alcester

Atherstone

Bedworth

Dunchurch

Fillongley

Henley-in-Arden

Kenilworth

Leamington Spa

Parade

Bath Street

Jephson Gardens

Nuneaton

Rugby

Stratford-upon-Avon

Town Centre

Bancroft Gardens

Henley Street

Rosebird Centre

Studley

Warwick

References 

Warwickshire
Culture in Warwickshire
Public art